The Satellite Home Viewer Act of 1988 comprises a set of regulations which govern the transmissions of television stations in the United States, specifically imposing the restriction of satellite carrier transmissions of a network station's transmissions only to subscribers who cannot receive these broadcasts via antenna and have not subscribed to a cable system providing these broadcasts, and which also concern regularizing satellite carriers' submission of lists of subscribers to networks, the coordination of broadcasting fees with territorial coverage of transmissions, and the distribution of fees to copyright owners of works included in transmissions.

See also 
 Must-carry
 Significantly viewed

References

http://transition.fcc.gov/mb/shva/ 

Broadcast law
Television terminology
United States federal communications legislation
Cable television in the United States
Satellite television